Bhai Bhai may refer to:

 Bhai-Bhai (1956 Hindi film), 1956 Indian film
 Bhai Bhai (1956 Odia film), 1956 Indian film
 Bhai-Bhai (1970 film), 1970 Indian Hindi-language film
 Bhai Bhai (1997 film), 1997 Indian Hindi-language action film

See also
 Bhai (disambiguation)